The Department of Works was an Australian government department that existed between June 1952 and November 1973. It was the third so-named Australian Government department.

Scope
Information about the department's functions and/or government funding allocation could be found in the Administrative Arrangements Orders, the annual Portfolio Budget Statements and in the department's annual reports.

The functions of the department were listed in Administrative Arrangements Orders as the planning execution and maintenance of Commonwealth
works.

Structure
The department was a Commonwealth Public Service department, staffed by officials who were responsible to the Minister for Works.

References

Works
Ministries established in 1952